The 2019–20 season was Sheffield Wednesday's eighth consecutive season in the Championship. Along with competing in the Championship, the club also participated in the FA Cup and the EFL Cup.

The season covered the period from 1 July 2019 to 22 July 2020.

Transfers and contracts

Transfers in

Transfers out

Loans in

Loans out

New contracts

Pre-season
As of 10 July 2019, Sheffield Wednesday have announced seven pre-season friendlies against Northampton Town, Lincoln City, Stocksbridge Park Steels, VfB Lubeck, Holstein Kiel, Shrewsbury Town and Espanyol.

Competitions

Championship

League table

Results summary

Results by matchday

Matches
On Thursday, 20 June 2019, the EFL Championship fixtures were revealed.

August

September

October

November

December

January

February

March

5 days later after 5-0 loss at Brentford EFL was suspended due to COVID-19 Pandemic

June

July

FA Cup

EFL Cup

Squad statistics

Appearances

|-
|}

Goalscorers

Includes all competitive matches.

Disciplinary record

Clean sheets

Awards

Player of the Month
Player of the Month awards for the 2019–20 season.

Player of the Year
Player of the Year award for the 2019–20 season.

References

Sheffield Wednesday
Sheffield Wednesday F.C. seasons